The 1998 Individual Long Track/Grasstrack World Championship was the 28th edition of the FIM speedway Individual Long Track World Championship.

The world title was won by Kelvin Tatum of England.

Venues

Final Classification

References 

1998
Motorsport in England
Speedway competitions in France
Speedway competitions in Germany
Speedway competitions in the Netherlands
Sports competitions in England
Long
Speedway competitions in the United Kingdom